This is a list of members of the South Australian House of Assembly from 1977 to 1979, as elected at the 1977 state election:

 The Labor member for Norwood and outgoing Premier of South Australia, Don Dunstan, resigned due to ill health on 15 February 1979. Labor candidate Greg Crafter won the resulting by-election on 10 March 1979.

Members of South Australian parliaments by term
20th-century Australian politicians